The Dala-fur (Dala pälsfår, Swedish) is a breed of domestic sheep originating in Sweden.  The Dala-fur is one of several sheep breeds that are remnants of the old Swedish landrace breed, and is one of the Northern European short-tailed sheep breeds.

Characteristics
This breed is white, small, short, hardy and has a short, wool-less tail. About 90% of all rams are horned while the ewes are polled (hornless).

In 2000, there were 160 Dala-fur sheep.  In 2002, the population decreased to 95 and 2006 there were 116.

References

Sheep breeds
Sheep breeds originating in Sweden